is a JR West Hakubi Line station. It is located in Minagi, Sōja, Okayama Prefecture, Japan.

History
1925-05-17: Minagi Station opens
1987-04-01: Japanese National Railways is privatized, and Minagi Station becomes a JR West station
2007-07-02: Minagi Station begins using the ICOCA automated ticket system

Station building and platforms
Minagi Station has three platforms capable of handling three lines simultaneously. Platform 1 is next to the station building, with platforms 2 and 3 on the island platform accessible via the overpass walkway (see photo at right).

Around the station
Minagi Station is located within a bend in the Takahashi River, which is across Japan National Route 180, about 300m south of Minagi Station. The Minagi Post Office is located nearby, as are Sōja Municipal Shōwa Elementary School and Sōja Municipal Shōwa Junior High School.

Highway access
 Japan National Route 180
 Okayama Prefectural Route 54 (Kurashiki-Minagi Route)
 Okayama Prefectural Route 166 (Minagi-Ibara Route)
 Okayama Prefectural Route 193 (Minagi Teishajō Route)
 Okayama Prefectural Route 306 (Kayō-Tanei Route)

Connecting lines
JR West Hakubi Line
Hiwa Station — Minagi Station — Bitchū-Hirose Station

See also
List of Railway Stations in Japan

External links
 JR West

Hakubi Line
Railway stations in Okayama Prefecture
Railway stations in Japan opened in 1925